Hisingsbron (the Hisingen Bridge) is a vertical-lift bridge in central Gothenburg, Sweden, connecting the island of Hisingen to the mainland. The bridge was constructed between 2017 and 2021, replacing the Götaälvbro, and was inaugurated on 5 September 2021 by King Carl XVI Gustaf.

References

Vertical lift bridges